Yevgeni Kirillovich Zezin (born 14 April 1976) is a former Russian professional football player.

Club career
He was the youngest player to ever play in the Russian Premier League (he played his first game in 1992 when he was 16 years 114 days old) until Aleksei Rebko has beat his record in 2002.

External links
 

1976 births
Footballers from Saint Petersburg
Living people
Russian footballers
Association football midfielders
Russia youth international footballers
Russian Premier League players
FC Zenit Saint Petersburg players
FC Kuban Krasnodar players
FC Metallurg Lipetsk players
FC Arsenal Tula players
FC Lukhovitsy players
FC Lokomotiv Saint Petersburg players